The Men's giant slalom competition of the Albertville 1992 Olympics was held at Val d'Isère.

The defending world champion was Rudolf Nierlich of Austria, while Italy's Alberto Tomba was the defending World Cup giant slalom champion and leader of the 1992 World Cup.

Results

References 

Men's giant slalom
Winter Olympics